Abdullah Bin Othman is the president of the Society for the Management of Autism Related issues in Training, Education and Resources in Brunei. In 2018, he was among the tenfrom the ASEAN region to receive the Padma Sri civilian honour by President of India, Ram Nath Kovind, for his work towards the betterment of autistic children and adults.

References 

Living people
Year of birth missing (living people)
Recipients of the Padma Shri in social work
Bruneian social workers
Autism activists